Llansantffraid Village F.C. is a Welsh football club based in Llansantffraid-ym-Mechain, Powys. They currently playing in the Central Wales League Northern Division. They joined this league after gaining promotion as Champions of the Montgomeryshire Football League in 2008–09.

The home colours are all green.

Honours

Montgomeryshire Football League Division One
2008–09
Montgomeryshire Football League Division Two
2007–08
Montgomeryshire Challenge Cup – Runners-up: 2017–18

References 

Football clubs in Wales
Mid Wales Football League clubs
2007 establishments in Wales
Sport in Powys